Domenico Sorrentino (1640–1708) was a Roman Catholic prelate who served as Bishop of Vulturara e Montecorvino (1676–1708) and Bishop of Ruvo (1673–1676).

Biography
Domenico Sorrentino was born in Cava on 25 Sep 1640 and ordained a priest on 21 Dec 1670.
He was appointed Bishop of Ruvo on 13 Mar 1673, by Pope Clement X.
On 16 Apr 1673, he was consecrated bishop by Francesco Maria Febei, Titular Archbishop of Tarsus, with Pier Antonio Capobianco, Bishop Emeritus of Lacedonia, and Giuseppe di Giacomo, Bishop of Bovino, serving as co-consecrators. 
On 27 Apr 1676, he was appointed Bishop of Vulturara e Montecorvino by Pope Clement X.
He served as Bishop of Vulturara e Montecorvino until his death in Sep 1708.

References

External links and additional sources

17th-century Italian Roman Catholic bishops
18th-century Italian Roman Catholic bishops
Bishops appointed by Pope Clement X
1640 births
1708 deaths